Earl of Romney (pronounced "Rumney") is a title that has been created twice.

It was first created in the Peerage of England in 1694 in favour of the soldier and politician Henry Sydney. He had been made Baron Milton and Viscount Sydney at the same time in 1689. Sydney was the younger son of Robert Sydney, 2nd Earl of Leicester. He never married and the titles became extinct on his death in 1704.

It was created for the second time in the Peerage of the United Kingdom in 1801 in favour of Charles Marsham, 3rd Baron Romney. The Marsham family descends from Sir John Marsham, one of the six Clerks of the Court of Chancery from 1638 to 1644 and from 1660 to 1680. In August 1663 he was created a Baronet, of Cuckston in the County of Kent, in the Baronetage of England. His grandson, the fourth Baronet (who succeeded his nephew), was also a Clerk of the Court of Chancery and represented Maidstone in the House of Commons. His son, the fifth Baronet, also sat as Member of Parliament for Maidstone and served as Governor of Dover Castle. In 1716 he was raised to the Peerage of Great Britain as Baron of Romney, of Romney in the County of Kent.

His grandson, the aforementioned third Baron, represented Maidstone and Kent in Parliament and served as Lord Lieutenant of Kent. In 1801 he was created Viscount Marsham, of The Mote in the County of Kent, and Earl of Romney, in the Peerage of the United Kingdom. He was succeeded by his son, the second Earl. He was Member of Parliament for Hythe and Downton. His son, the third Earl, represented Kent West in the House of Commons. He was succeeded by his son, the fourth Earl, who held political office in the second Conservative government of Lord Salisbury as a Lord-in-waiting (government whip in the House of Lords) from 1889 to 1892.

The line of his eldest son, the fifth Earl, failed on the death of the latter's son, the sixth Earl, in 1975. The late Earl was succeeded by his first cousin, the seventh Earl. He was the son of Lieutenant-Colonel Reginald Hastings Marsham, second son of the fourth Earl.  the titles are held by his first cousin once removed, the eighth Earl, who succeeded in 2004. He is the son of Colonel Peter William Marsham, son of Sydney Edward Marsham, youngest son of the fourth Earl.

The family seat was at Mote House, near Maidstone, Kent, but since 1891 it has been the Gayton Hall Estate at Gayton near Kings Lynn, Norfolk.

Earls of Romney, first creation

Viscounts Sydney (1689)
Henry Sydney, 1st Viscount Sydney (1641–1704) (created Earl of Romney in 1694)

Earls of Romney (1694)
Henry Sydney, 1st Earl of Romney (1641–1704)

Earls of Romney, second creation

Marsham baronets, of Cuckston (1663)
Sir John Marsham, 1st Baronet (1602–1685)
Sir John Marsham, 2nd Baronet (1637–1692)
Sir John Marsham, 3rd Baronet (1679–1696)
Sir Robert Marsham, 4th Baronet (1650–1703)
Sir Robert Marsham, 5th Baronet (1685–1724) (created Baron Romney in 1716)

Barons Romney (1716)
Robert Marsham, 1st Baron Romney (1685–1724)
Robert Marsham, 2nd Baron Romney (1712–1794)
Charles Marsham, 3rd Baron Romney (1744–1811) (created Viscount Marsham and Earl of Romney in 1801)

Earls of Romney (1801)
Charles Marsham, 1st Earl of Romney (1744–1811)
Charles Marsham, 2nd Earl of Romney (1777–1845)
Charles Marsham, 3rd Earl of Romney (1808–1874)
Charles Marsham, 4th Earl of Romney (1841–1905)
Charles Marsham, 5th Earl of Romney (1864–1933)
Charles Marsham, 6th Earl of Romney (1892–1975)
Michael Henry Marsham, 7th Earl of Romney (1910–2004)
Julian Charles Marsham, 8th Earl of Romney (b. 1948)

The heir apparent is the present holder's son, Lieutenant Colonel David Charles Marsham, Viscount Marsham (b. 1977), current commanding officer of 1st Battalion Coldstream Guards
The heir apparent's heir apparent is his son, Hon. James Julian Marsham (b. 2014)

See also
Earl of Leicester (1618 creation)

References

Further reading
Kidd, Charles, Williamson, David (editors). Debrett's Peerage and Baronetage (1990 edition). New York: St Martin's Press, 1990, 
 John Burke A General and heraldic dictionary of the peerage and baronetage of the British Empire Volume 2 1832 
Obituary of Charles Marsham, 2nd Earl of Romney from the Gentleman's Magazine Published 1845 at Google Books
 Obituary of Michael Henry Marsham, 7th Earl of Romney at The Daily Telegraph, 9 June 2004

External links

Extinct earldoms in the Peerage of England
Earldoms in the Peerage of the United Kingdom
1694 establishments in England
Noble titles created in 1694
Noble titles created in 1801